Powelton is an unincorporated community in Hancock County, in the U.S. state of Georgia.

History
The Georgia General Assembly incorporated Powelton in 1816; the town's municipal charter was repealed in 1901. A post office was in operation at Powelton from 1804 until 1913.

Powelton was the location, in 1822, of a meeting of Baptists that led to the formation of the Georgia Baptist Convention - see pic.

References

Former municipalities in Georgia (U.S. state)
Unincorporated communities in Hancock County, Georgia
Unincorporated communities in Georgia (U.S. state)